Return of the Grievous Angel: A Tribute to Gram Parsons is a 1999 tribute album to pioneering country rock musician Gram Parsons, co-produced by his one-time singing partner, Emmylou Harris and featuring cover versions of songs written/co-written by or popularized by Parsons, performed by Harris, Beck, Wilco, The Pretenders, Cowboy Junkies, Elvis Costello, Sheryl Crow, Lucinda Williams, David Crosby, Steve Earle, Chris Hillman and many other artists.  The album was released from Almo Sounds and benefited Vietnam Veterans of America Foundation's "Campaign for a Landmine Free World."

The album surveys Parsons' songwriting efforts from his time with International Submarine Band and the Flying Burrito Brothers to his solo career.

The album cover features a photo of Parsons' ornate tailored suit jacket designed by Nudie Cohn, which was worn for the cover of the Burritos' album, The Gilded Palace of Sin.  Parts of the album were performed on September 19, 1999 on the PBS show Sessions at West 54th Street. The performance included a version of the song "Wheels" which did not appear on the album by Chris Hillman and Jim Lauderdale.  Emmylou Harris, Steve Earle, Chris Hillman, Ryan Adams and Whiskeytown, Jim Lauderdale, Gillian Welch, David Rawlings, and Bernie Leadon were some of the performers on the show.

Track listing

References

External links
Review and information on the performance at Sessions at West 54th Street from Mark Maurer of Miked
Information on performance at Sessions at West 54th Street for Ryan Adams Archive.com including set list and band members
EmmyLou Harris's discussion of the Album on her website

Tribute albums
Alternative country albums by American artists
Country albums by American artists
1999 compilation albums